The nasal infix is a reconstructed nasal consonant or syllable  that was inserted (infixed) into the stem or root of a word in the Proto-Indo-European language. It has reflexes in several ancient and modern Indo-European languages. It is one of the affixes that mark the present tense.

Proto-Indo-European
In the Proto-Indo-European language (PIE), the nasal infix  is one of several means to form the athematic present tense. It is inserted immediately before the last consonant of the zero-grade root.

For example, the PIE root  "to win" would yield a nasal-infixed present stem .

These presents are called nasal infix presents or simply nasal presents and are typically active transitive verbs, often with durative aspect.

Origins
Since the linguistic ancestor of PIE is not known, there can only be speculations about the origins of the nasal infix.

Other present tense markers
All in all, PIE has at least 18 ways to form the present tense. For many verbs, several of these presents can be reconstructed simultaneously.

It is not clear why there were so many different types of present forms with no or little discernible differences in meaning. The authors of the Lexikon der indogermanischen Verben proposed that they were derived from a number of prior grammatical aspects with distinct (but lost) meanings.

Indo-European languages
The effects of the nasal infix can be seen in Indo-European languages like Sanskrit, Latin, Lithuanian, Armenian, Ancient Greek, the Goidelic languages,  and the Slavic languages.

Indo-Aryan

The phenomenon of nasal-infixing as inherited from Proto-Indo-European is found in Sanskrit with the greatest morphological transparency, and is taken as a guide to examining the feature in kindred languages.

Three of the ten classes identified by traditional Sanskrit grammarians have nasal infix of some kind, which are higher-grade and accent-bearing in the strong forms, and reduced-grade in the weak forms. The behaviour of the class-7 root √yuj- class-5 √śru- and class-9 krī- can be seen thus: 

 yu·ná·k·ti ↔ yu·ñj·ánti (-na- vs -n-)
 śṛ·ṇó·ti ↔ śṛ·ṇv·ánti  (-no- vs -nu-)
 krī·ṇā́·ti ↔ krī·ṇ·ánti (-nā- vs -n-)

While these were seen as 3 separate classes by the ancient Sanskrit grammarians, Ferdinand Saussure demonstrated, as part of his landmark work in postulating the Laryngeal theory, that these were slightly different manifestations of the same nasal infix.

Greek
Greek has some verbs that show a nasal infix in the present as opposed to other forms of the verb:
 λαμβάνω (lambánō "to take, receive, get") against aorist ἔλᾰβον (élabon)
 λανθάνω (lanthánō "to escape notice, cause to forget") against alternative λήθω (lḗthō; compare lḗthē and alḗtheia)
 τυγχάνω (tunkhánō "to happen to do sth., to succeed") against aorist ἔτυχον (étukhon)

Latin
Latin has a number of verbs with an n in the present stem which is missing in the perfect stem:
 "has won" /  "wins" (from the PIE verb above)
 "has crushed" /  "crushes"
 "has cut" /  "cuts"

Latin loanwords
English and the other Germanic languages show only vestiges of the nasal infix. The only certain remaining example is English stand, with the past tense stood lacking the n. However, it can still be seen in some pairs of Latin loanwords:

confuse – confound (Latin )
impact – impinge (Latin , from )
conviction – convince (Latin )

Celtic
In Celtic, the Indo-European nasal infix presents split into two categories: ones originally derived from laryngeal-final roots (i.e. seṭ roots in Sanskrit), and ones that were not (i.e. from aniṭ roots). In seṭ verbs, the nasal appears at the end of the present stem, while in aniṭ-derived verbs the nasal was followed by a root-final stop (generally -g- in Old Irish). The nasal presents are readily apparent in Old Irish, where the nasal infix is not present outside of the present stem, like in other old Indo-European languages.

The seṭ nasal presents' final nasal, ultimately from the nasal infix, was generalized to become suffixed onto all verbs in modern Irish as the present analytic suffix -(e)ann, remaining productive into modern times.

Slavic languages
Only vestiges are left, like Russian лечь ( [root "leg"]) (to lie down) : лягу (*lęgǫ) (I will lie down), сесть (*sĕsti [root "sĕd"]) (to sit down) : сяду (*sędǫ) (I will sit down) (both e:en).

Examples
This table shows some examples of PIE root aorists (without an infix), their infixed present forms and the reflexes (corresponding forms) in an attested daughter language.

†The Latin reflexes of the PIE aorist came to be used as the perfect.

‡It is uncertain whether  had a nasal infix already in PIE, since Greek  is only attested after Homer.

Quenya
In J. R. R. Tolkien's constructed language Quenya, the nasal infix forms the past tense of verbs ending in any consonant besides -m, -n, or -r. Thus, cen- "to see" has the past tense cen-në, but mat- "to eat" has not *mat-në but the metathesised ma⟨n⟩t-ë.

Notes

References

Bibliography

 
 

 
 

Proto-Indo-European language
Infixes